This is a list of flag bearers who have represented Hong Kong at the Olympics.

Flag bearers carry the national flag of their country at the opening ceremony and the closing ceremony of the Olympic Games.

See also 
 Hong Kong at the Olympics

References 

Hong Kong at the Olympics
Hong Kong
Olympic flagbearers